Highway 209 is a highway in the Canadian province of Saskatchewan. It runs from Highway 9 near Kenosee Lake until a point 5 km later, within the Moose Mountain Provincial Park.

Moose Mountain Provincial Park amenities, such as the Fish Creek and Lynwood camping sites are accessible from Highway 209.

References

209